The Silver Slugger Award is awarded annually to the best offensive player at each position in both the American League (AL) and the National League (NL), as determined by the coaches and managers of Major League Baseball (MLB). These voters consider several offensive categories in selecting the winners, including batting average, slugging percentage, and on-base percentage (OBP), in addition to "coaches' and managers' general impressions of a player's overall offensive value". Managers and coaches are not permitted to vote for players on their own team. The Silver Slugger was first awarded in 1980 and is given by Hillerich & Bradsby, the manufacturer of Louisville Slugger bats. The award is a bat-shaped trophy, 3 feet (91 cm) tall, engraved with the names of each of the winners from the league and plated with sterling silver.

Among catchers, Mike Piazza has won the most Silver Slugger Awards, with ten consecutive wins in the National League between 1993 and 2002; this is the most Silver Sluggers won consecutively by any player in Major League Baseball. In the American League, Iván Rodríguez has won the most Silver Sluggers, with six consecutive wins from 1994 to 1999, and a seventh when he tied with Víctor Martínez in 2004. Lance Parrish won the American League award six times (1980, 1982–1984, 1986, and 1990), and Joe Mauer and Jorge Posada have won it five times; Mauer won in 2006, 2008–2010 and 2013, while Posada won in 2000–2003 and 2007. Hall of Famer Gary Carter (1981–1983, 1984–1986) and Brian McCann (2006, 2008–2011) are five-time winners in the National League. Other multiple awardees include Buster Posey (four wins; 2012, 2014–2015, 2017), Benito Santiago (four wins; 1987–1988, 1990–1991), Mickey Tettleton (three wins; 1989, 1991–1992) and Carlton Fisk (three wins; 1981, 1985, 1988). Buster Posey and Salvador Pérez are the most recent National and American League winners, respectively.

Piazza holds several Major League records for catchers in a Silver Slugger-winning season; most were set in 1997. That season, he had an on-base percentage of .431, and had 124 runs batted in (a total he matched in 1999) to lead the award-winning catchers in those statistical categories. Javy López holds the Major League records among winners for home runs (43) and slugging percentage (.687); these were set in 2003. Mauer holds the Major League record in batting average with a .365 clip he set in 2009. Mauer also leads the American League in on-base percentage (.444 in 2009). Mitch Garver's .630 slugging percentage in 2019 tops the American League in that category. Parrish batted in 114 runs in 1983, and Fisk hit 37 home runs in 1985.

Key

American League winners

National League winners

References

Inline citations

External links
Louisville Slugger - The Silver Slugger Award

Silver Slugger Award
Awards established in 1980